The Caravanserai of Zor is a 13th-century Armenian caravanserai located 35 kilometers southwest of modern-day Iğdır. Built during the period of Zakarid Armenia, it was commissioned by the Zakarian-Mkhargrdzeli princes and designed by an Armenian architect named Ashot. It was an important stop in the trade routes to the city of Ani and the Silk Road.

Its architectural style is connected to those of the churches and caravanserais in Ani and the Aragatsotn Province of Armenia of the period. It also shows similarities to Seljuk architecture, showing the growing influence of Armenian architecture on the Seljuk empire. The present-day structure is a result of a controversial restoration by the Turkish government.

History 

Most scholars state that the Caravanserai of Zor was commissioned in the 13th century by the Zakarid princes of Armenia. On the other hand, French art historian Jean-Michel Thierry believes that the caravanserai was commissioned by the Mongols during the period of Mongol Armenia and was built by an Armenian architect. Certain Turkish authors have attempted to attribute the building to the Seljuks, however, this hypothesis has been widely rejected. The structure was built by the medieval Armenian architect Ashot. The Caravanserai was located on a road that served as an alternate route to Ani, that diverged from the traditional Erzurum-Tabriz route, and was also linked to trade routes from the south that connected the Lake Van region to the silk road.

The structure was first studied by the Armenian archaeologist Ashkarbek Loris-Kalantar in 1913, who gave it the name “Zor” after the nearby village of Zor, 15 kilometers away. Its original name is unknown. Loris-Kalantar noted an inscription in Arabic, carved on the ceiling of the southern room, that said "Constructed by Ashot.” The only surviving inscription is Russian graffiti dating back to 1845.

Architecture 

Archaeologist Loris-Kalantar describes the caravanserai as “a rare and exceptional example of Armenian medieval art and architecture.” The architecture resembles that of the Aruch and Talin caravanserais in Armenia, while the entrance portal resembles that of Armenian church architecture, especially the Tigran Honents and Holy Apostles churches in Ani. In addition, these styles show similarities with Seljuk constructions to the west, showing the influence of Armenian architecture in the architectural style of the Seljuks in Anatolia. The masonry of the entrance portal is ornate, decorated with geometric stars, lacework, and three vaulted rooms similar to that found in Ani. The interior consists of a rectangular hall with two zones, an eastern and western chamber. The external walls each have five semicircular walls which may have served a defensive function. The caravanserai was completely renovated in 2008 as part of an initiative by the Turkish government to increase tourism in the region.

See also 
 List of caravanserais in Armenia

Notes

Bibliography

External links 

VirtualANI: Caravanserai of Zor
TDV Encyclopedia of Islam: Iğdır Kervansarayı (in Turkish)

Buildings and structures completed in the 13th century
Armenian buildings in Turkey
Caravanserais in Turkey
History of Iğdır Province
Zakarids